Half Past Dead 2 is a 2007 American action film directed by Art Camacho and starring Bill Goldberg and Kurupt. It is a sequel to the 2002 film Half Past Dead. Kurupt and Tony Plana are the only actors to return from the first film.  The film was released straight to video in the United States on May 15, 2007.

Plot
After the New Alcatraz massacre, long time inmate Twitch (Kurupt) gets himself transferred to another. He claims it's to be closer to his lady, but his real motives are a bit more grandiose than that.

There he crosses paths with Burke (Bill Goldberg) a bulky prisoner who is unfriendly and doesn't want to talk about anyone. Twitch, despite being less muscular, is just as mouthy and is pretty much the same. But there is a gang war brewing between the Black and Hispanic inmates that explodes into a hostile takeover of the prison when the Blacks' gang leader is shot dead and the finger points at Burke. But the situations worsen when the real killer and leader of the Hispanics, Cortez (Robert Madrid) takes Twitch's girlfriend (Angell Conwell) and Burke's daughter (Alona Tal) hostage as well, betraying his comrades to escape. Eventually things get more complicated as Twitch's real reason for his transfer is to find the gold from the heist, organized from the fellow New Alcatraz inmate Lester McKena.

Cortez demands a helicopter out of state or otherwise the hostages are dead. Burke and Twitch eventually catch up to Cortez and after a long fight with Burke ending up wounded, Cortez is knocked out and transferred to another prison.

Twitch is given parole after his actions that could have seen him wait even longer before he actually gets out, with Burke having to serve only a few more weeks rather than years. Twitch and his girlfriend find the gold and, as a favor for Burke, set up his account with 80 million dollars along with a plan to help Burke's daughter for college, surprising Burke himself.

Cast
 Kurupt as Bernard "Twitch"
 Bill Goldberg as William Burke
 Angell Conwell as	Cherise
 Robert Madrid as Alex Cortez
 Joe Perez as Lewis
 Alona Tal as Ellie
 Morocco Omari as J.T.
 Jack Conley as Wallace
 Robert LaSardo as Rivera
 Tony Plana as Warden Juan Ruiz "El Fuego" Escarzaga
 Bruce Weitz as Lester McKenna (archive footage)

Music
The main title for Half Past Dead 2, "Day By Day", was written by Jon Lee and Redd Stylez. The vocals were performed by Rap artist Redd Stylez.

External links

 

2007 direct-to-video films
2007 films
2007 action films
American action films
American direct-to-video films
Direct-to-video sequel films
American prison films
2000s English-language films
Films directed by Art Camacho
2000s American films